Mahabhara  is a village development committee in Jhapa District in the Province No. 1 of south-eastern Nepal. At the time of the 1991 Nepal census it had a population of 6657 people living in 1272 individual households. There were 9 wards in total but now it is a part of Gauriunj gaunpalika.

References

Populated places in Jhapa District